STT may refer to:

Organizations
 ST Telemedia, a portfolio company of Temasek Holdings
 Stabilimento Tecnico Triestino, a shipbuilding company in Italy
 State Street Corp. (NYSE symbol), a US financial services company
 STT Telkom, a telecommunication engineering school
 Suomen Tietotoimisto, a Finnish news agency
 Special Investigation Service, a Lithuanian anti-corruption agency

Computing
 Speech to text, converting spoken audio into text
 Single transaction translator, a particular functional unit in USB hubs
 Spin torque transfer, a computer hardware technology

Other uses
 Cyril E. King Airport (IATA and FAA LID), St. Thomas, U.S. Virgin Islands
 Soft tissue therapy, a physical treatment
 Spinothalamic tract, a sensory pathway from skin to thalamus
 Spread tow tape, in making spread tow fabric
 Stewarton railway station (station code), Scotland

See also
 ST2 (disambiguation)